Donald Bain  may refer to:
Donald III of Scotland ( 1033–1099), king of Scotland 
Donald Bain (writer) (1935–2017), United States author and ghostwriter
Donald Bain, first husband of the Scottish Nationalist politician Margaret Ewing
Dan Bain (Donald Henderson Bain, 1874–1962), Canadian athlete and merchant